Summerfield is an unincorporated community in Le Flore County, Oklahoma, United States.

Summerfield was the name of an early settler who operated a commissary.

It is the location of the Summerfield School, built in 1937, which is listed on the National Register of Historic Places.

References

Unincorporated communities in Le Flore County, Oklahoma
Unincorporated communities in Oklahoma